Otford to Shoreham Downs is a  biological Site of Special Scientific Interest between Kemsing and Eynesford in Kent. It is part of Kent Downs Area of Outstanding Natural Beauty and part it is Fackenden Down, a nature reserve managed by the Kent Wildlife Trust

These downs have woodland, scrub and species-rich chalk grassland, which has been traditionally managed by grazing. A decline in grazing has caused the chalk downland to become overgrown, but it is still very species diverse, with over a hundred plants recorded.

References

Sites of Special Scientific Interest in Kent